Reudnitz is the name of several places in Germany. It is of Slavic origin.

 a subdistrict of the East district of Leipzig, Saxony
 a district of Mohlsdorf-Teichwolframsdorf, Thuringia
 a district of Friedland, Brandenburg
 a district of Cavertitz, Saxony